Admiral Sir Erasmus Gower (3 December 1742 – 21 June 1814) was a Welsh naval officer and colonial governor.

Naval career
Gower, aged 13, joined the Royal Navy in 1755 under the patronage of his uncle, Captain John Donkley. He was promoted to lieutenant, serving with distinction under Commander Philip Carteret from 1766 to 1769. He then served in the Falkland Islands, West Indies, Mediterranean, the East and Newfoundland until 1792, when he declined a baronetcy and was knighted.

In 1792, Gower was named Commander of the first British diplomatic mission to imperial China and sailed in the 64-gun HMS Lion. This expedition was headed by Lord George Macartney. They were also accompanied by East Indiaman Hindostan, chartered from the East India Company for the mission.  Although the Macartney Embassy returned to London without obtaining any concession from China, the mission could have been termed a success because it brought back detailed observations. Gower had planned a secret visit to Japan, the Philippines and Celebes while Macartney was in China but was frustrated by adverse weather conditions and lack of essential medical supplies.

George Staunton, Secretary to the Embassy, was charged with producing the official account of the expedition after their return. This multi-volume work was taken chiefly from the papers of Lord Macartney and from the papers of Commander Gower. Sir Joseph Banks, the President of the Royal Society, was responsible for selecting and arranging engraving of the illustrations in this official record.

Soon after returning from China, Gower, in HMS Triumph (1764) (74) played an important role in Cornwallis's Retreat when the small squadron under Vice-Admiral Sir William Cornwallis escaped from a French fleet of superior numbers. Cornwallis later wrote The steady conduct of the Triumph was admirable – Sir Erasmus Gower treated the scattered fire of the Enemy with the utmost contempt, and by firing single well directed Guns, the Enemy’s Ships were deterred from approaching.

During the devastating Spithead and Nore mutinies in 1797 Gower was given command a fleet in the upper Thames River to oppose the more than 10,000 strong mutineers it was thought would move up river from the Nore and attack London. At the end of the mutiny he sat on the courts martial which tried over 400 men.

Admiral and commodore-governor
Gower was promoted rear-admiral of the white in February 1799 and hoisted his flag in HMS Princess Royal in the Channel Fleet and Ireland, with his protege David Atkins as flag captain. 

In 1804, he was promoted to vice-admiral of the white and appointed governor and commander-in-chief of Newfoundland. 

Gower Street in St. John's is named in his honour. In late 1804, Gower sent the hired cutter Queen Charlotte, under a Lieutenant Morrison, to Labrador to investigate reports of an influx of American fishing boats. As a result of the report, the Admiralty decided to station a sloop in the fishing waters to chase off the Americans. 

Noted as a meticulous administrator, he was promoted to admiral of the white in 1810 and died at his home near Hambledon, Hampshire in 1814.

His recent biographer has claimed – No other contemporary officer approached his accumulated experience.

See also 
 Governors of Newfoundland
 List of people of Newfoundland and Labrador

Notes

References
 Barrow, John. (1807).  Some Account of the Public Life, and a Selection from the Unpublished Writings, of the Earl of Macartney, 2 vols. London: T. Cadell and W. Davies.
 Bates, Ian M (2017) Champion of the Quarterdeck: Admiral Sir Erasmus Gower (1742–1814) Pomona Sage Old Books 
 Cranmer-Byng, J. L. "Lord Macartney’s Embassy to Peking in 1793." Journal of Oriental Studies. Vol. 4, Nos. 1,2 (1957–58): 117–187.
 Esherick, Joseph W. "Cherishing Sources from Afar." Modern China Vol. 24, No. 2 (1998): 135–61.
 Hevia, James Louis. (1995).  Cherishing Men from Afar: Qing Guest Ritual and the Macartney Embassy of 1793. Durham: Duke University Press. 
 Peyrefitte, Alain. (1992). The Immobile Empire (Jon Rotschild, translator). New York: Alfred A. Knopf/Random House.  [https://archive.org/details/immobileempire00peyr   Internet Archive]
 Peyrefitte, Allain. (1990). Images de l'Empire immobile ou le choc des mondes. Récit historique. Paris: Fayard.  (paper)
 Robbins, Helen Henrietta Macartney (1908). Our First Ambassador to China: An Account of the Life of George, Earl of Macartney with Extracts from His Letters, and the Narrative of His Experiences in China, as Told by Himself, 1737–1806, from Hitherto Unpublished Correspondence and Documents.  London : John Murray. [digitized by University of Hong Kong Libraries, Digital Initiatives, "China Through Western Eyes." ]
 Rockhill, William Woodville.  "Diplomatic Missions to the Court of China: The Kotow Question I," The American Historical Review, Vol. 2, No. 3 (Apr., 1897), pp. 427–442.
 Rockhill, William Woodville.  "Diplomatic Missions to the Court of China: The Kotow Question II," The American Historical Review, Vol. 2, No. 4 (Jul., 1897), pp. 627–643.
 Staunton, George Leonard. (1797).  An  Authentic Account of and Embassy from the King of Great Britain to the Emperor of China, 3 vols. London: G. Nichol.

External links

Biography at Government House The Governorship of Newfoundland and Labrador
Biography web page A comprehensive biography Champion of the Quarterdeck: Admiral Sir Erasmus Gower 1742–1814'' was published in 2017.

1742 births
1814 deaths
Royal Navy admirals
Governors of Newfoundland Colony
Welsh naval officers
Knights Bachelor